The 1995 Australian Masters was a professional non-ranking snooker tournament that took place between 14 and 16 September 1995 at the Bentleigh Club in Melbourne, Australia.

Anthony Hamilton won the tournament by defeating Chris Small 8–6 in the final.

Main draw

References

Australian Goldfields Open
1995 in Australian sport
1995 in snooker
September 1995 sports events in Australia